The United States national under-20 rugby union team, for sponsorship reasons known as the AIG Men's Junior All-Americans, is the United States' junior rugby team at the national level. The U-20 team has competed at the IRB Junior World Championship and at several IRB Junior World Rugby Trophy tournaments.

History 
The U20 program was originally a U19 team. With the decision by the International Rugby Board to merge their U19 and Under 21 Rugby World Championships to form the IRB Junior World Championship for U20 players effective as of the 2008 season, the team evolved into a U20 team to participate in the new competitions.

The first competition for the U20 team was on June 6, 2008, against South Africa.
The U.S. won the 2012 IRB Junior World Rugby Trophy under head coach Scott Lawrence.

World Rugby Under 20 Championship and Trophy

Current squad
Squad for the  World Rugby Under 20 Trophy.

Management
Billy Millard - Head Coach
David Williams - Assistant Coach
Luke Gross - Assistant Coach
Michael Engelbrecht - Assistant Coach
Dennis Greenhill JR - Physiotherapist
Terrence Cronin - Team Doctor

Notable players

Scoring leaders
 Madison Hughes - 82 points scored (including 12 penalties & 6 tries) in JWRT competitions.
 Robert Johnson - 35 points scored (including 12 conversions) in JWRT competitions.
 Tai Enosa - 3 drop goals in JRWT competitions (tied for all-time lead among players from all countries).

Graduates to men’s national team
The following players, who have played for the US youth team, have also gone on to represent the senior men's team in 15s or 7s:

 Madison Hughes - A key player in the USA U20's to their first JWRT victory, scoring 100 points to become the all time JWRT leading scorer.  Hughes captained the USA Seven's team bound for the Rio 2016 Olympics.
Todd Clever
 Mike Petri
 Takudzwa Ngwenya
 Tai Enosa - 2009 JWRT scored 23 pts 
 Zack Test - 2009 JWRT scored 3 tries 
 Peter Tiberio - 2009 JWRT started 3 matches 
 Cam Dolan - 2009 JWRT team captain

See also
United States national under-23 rugby union team (Collegiate All Americans)

References

External links
 www.usarugby.org

R
National under-20 rugby union teams